Gamaster is a genus of ascidian tunicates in the family Molgulidae.

Species within the genus Gamaster include:
 Gamaster dakarensis Pizon, 1896 
 Gamaster guillei Monniot, 1994 
 Gamaster vallatum Monniot, 1978

Species names currently considered to be synonyms:
 Gamaster japonicus Oka, 1934: synonym of Eugyra japonicus (Oka, 1934)

References

Stolidobranchia
Tunicate genera